Mattern is a surname. Notable people with the surname include:

Al Mattern (1883–1958), professional baseball player
Blakely Mattern (born 1988), American soccer defender
Cody Mattern (born 1981), American fencer
Friedemann Mattern (born 1955), German scientist
Horst Mattern (born 1943), West German sprint canoeist
Jimmie Mattern (1905–1988), American aviator
Joachim Mattern (born 1948), East German sprint canoeist
Richard Mattern Montgomery (1911–1987), Chief-of-Staff of the U. S. Strategic Air Command 1952–1956
Walter Mattern (1913–1974), Hauptsturmführer (Captain) in the Waffen-SS during World War II
Yvette Mattern, Pureto Rican artist

See also
Young-Yentes-Mattern Farm, Huntington, Indiana, USA
Matte (disambiguation)